Conserving Carolina is a non-profit conservation organization working to preserve water and land resources in Western North Carolina.  Conserving Carolina was created in July 2017, from a merger of two previously-separate organizations, Carolina Mountain Land Conservancy and Pacolet Area Conservancy.  The combined organization maintains a primary office in Hendersonville, NC and a regional office in Columbus, NC.

History

What was to become the Carolina Mountain Land Conservancy, now Conserving Carolina, began with a 1991 natural areas inventory of Henderson County, NC, which identified numerous places in the County with intact and important natural resources worthy of conservation. In 1994, the Natural Heritage Trust of Henderson County was formed to seek protection of these important sites. A year later, it was renamed the Carolina Mountain Land Conservancy and expanded its area of focus to include Transylvania and parts of Buncombe, Rutherford, Polk and Jackson Counties. The organization began working with local landowners to protect farm, forest, park, and natural lands with the support of local community members.

The Pacolet Area Conservancy was formed in 1989 to conserve land and water resources in Polk County, North Carolina and parts of the Pacolet River watershed across the state line in the Landrum area of South Carolina. Prior to the merger in 2017, Pacolet Area Conservancy helped protect more than 10,000 acres of forests, farms, greenspace, mountains, and waterways, including 1,500 acres at the Walnut Creek Preserve in northern Polk County.

After over a year of discussions focused on greater collaboration between the organizations, the two conservancies decide to join in order to more effectively advance their common mission to conserve natural resources in their burgeoning region within the Carolinas for generations to come. With an expanded geographic region, the merged organization combines expertise, talents, resources and a strengthened ability to protect land and water resources, and foster appreciation of the region's unique natural heritage.

Approach

Conserving Carolina works with various sectors of society including businesses, individuals, communities, partner organizations, and government agencies to achieve its goals. Conserving Carolina uses a mix of financial incentives along with the goodwill of conservation-minded landowners to preserve land from development.

Conserving Carolina has pioneered the use of conservation easements in Henderson and Transylvania Counties.  A conservation easement is a way for landowners to ensure that their land remains in its natural state while capitalizing on some of the land's potential development value.  Conserving Carolina also works with the North Carolina Division of State Parks and other government partners to acquire land for sites such as Chimney Rock State Park.

Significant Conservation

Chimney Rock State Park

In December 2009, Conserving Carolina acquired the  Weed Patch Mountain tract north of Lake Lure, which adds to the corridor of conserved land including the State Park.

Green River Preserve

The Green River area is listed under the North Carolina Natural Heritage identified natural area, significant for a diversity of habitat types including granite dome outcrops, steep cliffs, rich cove forests, Carolina hemlock bluffs, and pine-oak forests. The conservation of this area was made possible by donations from the Schenck and Ball families, with help from the Clean Water Management Trust Fund.

Florence Nature Preserve

The Florence Nature Preserve is a 600-acre (2.4 km2) tract located in the upper Hickory Nut Gorge area near Gerton, North Carolina.  Donated by Dr. Tom and Glenna Florence in two phases (1996 and 2001) the preserve is open to the general public for hiking.

Lewis Creek Nature Preserve
Lewis Creek Nature Preserve is located in Edneyville, North Carolina.  The preserve is home to a  mixed Appalachian Bog.  This ecosystem is listed as critically endangered with only  of this variety of bogs and fens still in existence, an 83 percent loss from the estimated  that once existed.

Conserving Carolina purchased the property that forms Lewis Creek Nature Park in 2004 to be maintained for the use of homeowners in the adjacent neighborhood. The North Carolina Ecosystem Enhancement Program has been contracted to conduct stream restoration on the portion of Lewis Creek running through the nature park.  The finish date of this project has been delayed from the original estimation of August 2008.  Due to the fragile and unique nature of the park, it is not open to the general public, but Conserving Carolina does hold tree planting and exotic invasive species removal workdays there.

Headwaters State Forest

In June 2010, CMLC, in partnership with The Conservation Fund, announced that  in the upper French Broad River watershed in Transylvania County, North Carolina was under contract for purchase with Champion Cattle and Tree Farms, a company owned by the family of former western North Carolina Congressman Charles H. Taylor. The tract lies on the South Carolina state line across from the City of Greenville's  Table Rock Watershed property.

Volunteerism

Like many non-profits, Conserving Carolina relies on the contribution of volunteers who constitute the board of directors, and participate in the day-to-day operations of the organization.  In 2007, volunteers contributed over 3,600 hours, saving the organization an estimated $70,236.00 (U.S) worth of staff time. Volunteer positions include office administrators, wildlife monitors, committee members, and tech support consultants.

See also
Conservation in the United States
Land trust
Conservation easement

References

External links
Protected Preserve - NC Mountain Property
Carolina Mountain Land Conservancy
Carolina Mountain Club
Land Trust Alliance

Land trusts in North Carolina
Environmental organizations established in 1994
1994 establishments in North Carolina